Johann Joseph Christian (12 February 1706 – 22 June 1777) was a German Baroque sculptor and woodcarver. His masterworks are considered to be the choir stalls in Zwiefalten Abbey and Ottobeuren Abbey.

Christian was born in Riedlingen, in Further Austria (present-day Baden-Württemberg).  His rare double gift as a woodworker and stucco sculptor was equalled only by Joseph Anton Feuchtmayer. In 1744 Christian received a commission to work in Zwiefalten Abbey, where until 1755 he created the choir stalls and numerous stucco figures for the high altar and nave and side chapels, working alongside the painter Franz Joseph Spiegler and the stucco master Johann Michael Feuchtmayer and under the direction of the architect Johann Michael Fischer.

Subsequently, Christian was commissioned to work on the abbatial church of the Holy Trinity in Ottobeuren Abbey, for which the architect was once again Fischer and for which Christian created the choir stalls, with gilded reliefs, and the organ reliefs. Once again he worked with Spiegler and J. M. Feuchtmayer.

Besides these two major works, he also worked on various smaller projects, including the parish church in Unlingen and the abbey church in Buchau.

Christian and his wife had 10 children, of whom five survived infancy. His son Karl Anton Christian (1731–1810) became abbot of St. Trudpert's Abbey near Münstertal in the Black Forest, and for this church J. J. Christian created a relief painting using a stucco technique for the high altar that is considered unparalleled. Christian died in Riedlingen.  Another son, Franz Joseph Christian (1739–1798), became a sculptor and took over his father's workshop in Riedlingen.

Major works
Münstertal—St. Trudpert's Abbey (high altar)
Ottobeuren—Ottobeuren Abbey, church of the Holy Trinity, (choir stalls and organ reliefs)
Wiblingen Abbey—church of St. Martin (choir stalls, created along with his son Franz Joseph)
Zwiefalten—Zwiefalten Abbey (choir stalls, high altar, and almost all other sculpture)

References

1706 births
1777 deaths
People from Riedlingen
18th-century German sculptors
18th-century German male artists
German male sculptors
German woodcarvers